Industrial data processing is a branch of applied computer science that covers the area of design and programming of computerized systems which are not computers as such — often referred to as embedded systems (PLCs, automated systems, intelligent instruments, etc.).  The products concerned contain at least one microprocessor or microcontroller, as well as couplers (for I/O).

Another current definition of industrial data processing is that it concerns those computer programs whose variables in some way represent physical quantities; for example the temperature and pressure of a tank, the position of a robot arm, etc.

Computer engineering